
This is a list of aircraft in alphabetical order beginning with 'S'.

Sz

Szaraz 
(Arpad "Art" Szaraz, Cleveland, OH)
 Szaraz SDS-1A Daphne

Szebeny-Oravecz
(György Szebeny -  Béla Oravecz)
 Szebeny-Oravecz Iskola(regn:H-MAAC)

Székely
(Mihály Székely)
 Székely 1 1910
 Székely Canard 1911
 Székely Újság 1912
 Székely Bübü 1913
 Székely Parasol

Szekely 
( (Otto E) Szekely Aircraft & Engine Co)
 Szekely Flying Dutchman

Sznycer 
(Bernard W. Sznycer, Sznycer-Gottlieb, Sznycer Helicopters)
 Sznycer SG-VI-C
 Sznycer SG-VI-D Grey Gull
 Sznycer SG-VI-E Grey Gull
 Sznycer Omega BS-12

References

Further reading

External links

 List Of Aircraft (S)

de:Liste von Flugzeugtypen/N–S
fr:Liste des aéronefs (N-S)
nl:Lijst van vliegtuigtypes (N-S)
pt:Anexo:Lista de aviões (N-S)
ru:Список самолётов (N-S)
sv:Lista över flygplan/N-S
vi:Danh sách máy bay (N-S)